The Lemnia is a tributary of the Râul Negru in Romania. It flows into the Râul Negru near the village Lemnia.

References

Rivers of Romania
Rivers of Covasna County